Razak Pimpong (born 30 December 1982) is a Ghanaian former professional footballer who played as a striker and attacking midfielder for FC Midtjylland, FC Copenhagen, Viborg FF and other clubs. He was very versatile and could also play wide either as a right sided midfielder or right winger.

Club career
Pimpong was brought from Ghana to Denmark by FC Midtjylland, and made his debut for the team in 2000. He played more than 100 times for FCM, scoring 25 league goals for the club. In July 2005, he agreed a move to league rivals F.C. København from January 2006.

Pimpong did not find initial success at FCK. His first, and only goal, for FCK came in April 2006, when he scored the deciding goal of the 2006 Royal League Final. He came on in the 69th minute and scored the only goal of the game in the 89th minute before he was sent off in injury time for overtly celebrating his goal.

In 2007, Pimpong was transferred to Norwegian Tippeligaen club Viking FK for a sum reported to be around 4 million Norwegian Kroner. He signed a contract keeping him at the club until 2010.

In February 2009, Egyptian side Al-Masry signed Pimpong from Viking FK. A few months later, on 27 July 2009, he signed for Danish club Viborg FF.

On 24 June 2013, he announced his retirement from professional football, but a month later he regretted his decision and made a six-month-deal with the Danish 2nd Division West club Ringkøbing IF.

International career
Pimpong was part of the Ghanaian 2004 Olympic football team, who exited in the first round, having finished in third place in group B.

He was called up for the Ghanaian squad for the 2006 FIFA World Cup in Germany. He has played nine games for the Ghana national team, and represented Ghana at the 2004 Summer Olympic football tournament as well as the 2006 World Cup in Germany.

Honours and awards
 FIFA World Youth Championship runner-up: 2001
 Danish Superliga: 2005–06

References

External links
 F.C. København statistics
 Fifa 2006 World Cup Profile

1982 births
2006 FIFA World Cup players
Aalesunds FK players
Accra Great Olympics F.C. players
Al Masry SC players
Association football forwards
Association football wingers
Danish Superliga players
Egyptian Premier League players
Eliteserien players
Expatriate men's footballers in Denmark
Expatriate footballers in Egypt
Expatriate footballers in Norway
F.C. Copenhagen players
FC Midtjylland players
Footballers at the 2004 Summer Olympics
Ghana international footballers
Ghana under-20 international footballers
Ghanaian expatriate footballers
Ghanaian expatriate sportspeople in Denmark
Ghanaian expatriate sportspeople in Egypt
Ghanaian expatriate sportspeople in Norway
Ghanaian footballers
Living people
Olympic footballers of Ghana
Ringkøbing IF players
Footballers from Accra
Viborg FF players
Viking FK players